David Catchings Dickson (February 25, 1818 – June 5, 1880) was an American politician and physician in early Texas who served as the ninth Speaker of the Texas House of Representatives and as the fourth Lieutenant Governor of Texas. He was also a State Senator and unsuccessfully ran for governor of Texas.

Dickson was born in Pike County, Mississippi. In 1830, Dickson’s family moved to Georgetown, Copiah County, Mississippi, where he married Sophronia L. Magee. Dickson attended medical school in Lexington, Kentucky, and after graduating in 1841, moved, as part of a large group, to the Montgomery County, Texas, community of Anderson (present-day Grimes County). Dickson served as a surgeon for the Army of the Republic of Texas. He served as a Justice of the Peace for Montgomery County beginning in 1845.

Sometime before 1850, Dickson had remarried, to the former Nancy Ann E. Magee.

Dickson served in the House of Representatives in the First, Third, and Fourth Texas Legislatures. In the Fourth Legislature, Dickson was elected Speaker of the House, defeating fellow representative Hardin Richard Runnels 30 votes to 27 on the tenth ballot.

In his acceptance speech, Dickson promised to work on eliminating debts incurred by the Republic of Texas and passed on to the state.

In 1853, he was elected lieutenant governor on the Democratic ticket with governor Elisha M. Pease. In 1855, with the backing of the American Party (better known as the “Know Nothings”), he ran for governor against Pease but was defeated by a large margin.

Dickson later returned to the state House, in 1859, for the Eighth Texas Legislature.

On November 16, 1859, he moved that an interpreter be provided for Representative Basilio Benavides of Webb County, an action which prompted outcry from the Dallas Herald. By the end of the Legislature, Dickson had decided not to run again for a House seat.

Dickson served as an officer of the local militia company during the Civil War, but when State Senator Anthony Martin Branch stepped down to serve in the Confederate States Army in 1862, Dickson was elected to complete Branch’s term in the Texas State Senate.

After the war, he was appointed financial agent of the State Penitentiary  in Huntsville by Governor James Webb Throckmorton and served in that capacity from 1866-67. During his time in Huntsville, Dickson attended to the inmates when a yellow fever outbreak occurred.

Dickson died on June 5, 1880, in Grimes County, Texas, and is buried near his home in Anderson. Dickson was a Mason.

Notes

References

 

1818 births
1880 deaths
Physicians from Texas
Lieutenant Governors of Texas
Speakers of the Texas House of Representatives
Democratic Party members of the Texas House of Representatives
Democratic Party Texas state senators
People from Pike County, Mississippi
Texas justices of the peace
Texas Know Nothings
People from Huntsville, Texas